The Klintzkopf, located in the French region of Alsace, is the fifth-highest summit of the Vosges Mountains.

Geography 

The mountain is divided between the French municipalities of Guebwiller and Munster (department of Haut-Rhin, Alsace).

The Klintzkopf is part of a nature reserve and it only can be accessed from July to November. It hosts the highest beech forest of the Vosges Mountains.

Access to the summit 
The summit of the Klintzkopf can be accessed on foot from the nearby Route des Crêtes. It offers a good point of view of the southern part of the Vosges Mountains.

See also 
 Hohneck
 Vosges Mountains

References 

Mountains of Haut-Rhin
One-thousanders of France
Mountains of the Vosges